The Everett Resort is located in Washington, Vilas County, Wisconsin, on a peninsula between Catfish and Cranberry Lakes. Started in the 1890s, it was one of the first resorts in the area. It was added to the National Register of Historic Places in 2008. It is situated about 4 miles east of the city of Eagle River, and is served by its post office.

History
The resort was established by Fred Morey in the 1890s, just as logging was winding down. In 1897, ownership was transferred to Edward and Helen Everett.

References

Buildings and structures in Vilas County, Wisconsin
Resorts in Wisconsin
National Register of Historic Places in Vilas County, Wisconsin
Temporary populated places on the National Register of Historic Places